Gary Strodder (born 1 April 1965) is an English former professional footballer who played as a centre half.

Career
Born in Cleckheaton, West Yorkshire, Strodder came through the youth system of Yorkshire Amateur. He joined Lincoln City in 1982, spending five years at the club and being voted the club's player of the year in 1986, before signing for West Ham United. After three years at West Ham, he moved on to West Bromwich Albion, who he helped to promotion via the playoff final at Wembley Stadium in a team managed by Argentinian and Tottenham Hotspur legend Ossie Ardiles. In 1996 he signed for Notts County, where he was selected for the Third Division PFA Team of the Year in 1997–98. In 1998–99 he had a spell on loan at Rotherham United, before joining Hartlepool United. In 2001 he dropped into non-League football with Guiseley. After retiring from playing he worked for the community development section at Leeds United, before going into business in Menorca.

Honours
Individual
PFA Team of the Year: 1997–98 Third Division

References

External links

1965 births
Living people
People from Cleckheaton
English footballers
English Football League players
Association football central defenders
Yorkshire Amateur A.F.C. players
Lincoln City F.C. players
West Ham United F.C. players
Notts County F.C. players
Rotherham United F.C. players
West Bromwich Albion F.C. players
Hartlepool United F.C. players
Guiseley A.F.C. players
Sportspeople from Yorkshire